Falling Creek is a stream in the U.S. state of Georgia. It is a tributary to the Broad River.

The creek was named after John Falling, a relative of Cherokee leader James Vann.

References

Rivers of Georgia (U.S. state)
Rivers of Elbert County, Georgia